Velino Selo is a village in the municipality of Čelić, Bosnia and Herzegovina.

Demographics 
According to the 2013 census, its population was 533.

References

Populated places in Čelić